The 2012 Copa Sevilla was a professional tennis tournament played on clay courts. It was the 15th edition of the tournament which was part of the 2012 ATP Challenger Tour. It took place in Seville, Spain between 10 and 16 September 2012.

Singles main draw entrants

Seeds

 1 Rankings are as of August 27, 2012.

Other entrants
The following players received wildcards into the singles main draw:
  David Vega Hernández
  Mario Vilella Martinez
  Agustín Boje-Ordóñez
  Tommy Robredo

The following players received entry as an alternate into the singles main draw:
  Taro Daniel

The following players received entry from the qualifying draw:
  David Estruch
  David Pérez Sanz
  Ricardo Rodríguez
  Nick van der Meer

Champions

Singles

 Daniel Gimeno Traver def.  Tommy Robredo, 6–3, 6–2

Doubles

 Nikola Ćirić /  Boris Pašanski def.  Stephan Fransen /  Jesse Huta Galung, 5–7, 6–4, [10–6]

External links
Official Website